O Povo is a Brazilian tabloid newspaper. Among the oldest Brazilian newspapers, it has been published since 1928. It is and has always been printed in Fortaleza, the capital of the Brazilian state of Ceará. It has a daily circulation of about 120,000 and is released in the morning.

Official site
 O Povo official website

References

1928 establishments in Brazil
Daily newspapers published in Brazil
Mass media in Fortaleza
Portuguese-language newspapers
Publications established in 1928